Ko Eun-ah (born February 16, 1946) is a South Korean actress. Ko's acting career spanned from 1965 to 1979, appearing in films including The Sea Village (1965), The General in Red Robes (1973) and Yeonhwa (1974). She won Popular Star Award at the Blue Dragon Film Awards in 1966, 1972 and 1973, and Lifetime Achievement Award at the 49th Grand Bell Awards in 2012.

Personal life 
Ko married film producer Kwak Jeong-hwan on November 21, 1967. Her first child was a son, followed by a daughter in August 1970.

Selected filmography

Awards and nominations

References

External links 
 
 

1946 births
Living people
South Korean film actresses
Actresses from Busan
Best Actress Paeksang Arts Award (film) winners